Ruchi Narain (born 1976) is an Indian film director, screenwriter, and producer widely known as the writer for the critically acclaimed film Hazaaron Khwaishein Aisi (2003). She has also directed films like Kal: Yesterday and Tomorrow (2005), Hanuman: Da' Damdaar (2017) and Netflix original film Guilty (2020).

Early life and education
Her family is originally from New Delhi, however, she has never lived there. She spent her early years in Calcutta, Dubai, Sri Lanka, Muscat, Oman where she attended the Sultan's School, The Woodstock School in Mussoorie, and Qatar. She moved to Mumbai for College and has lived there ever since.

Career
She started her career as an assistant director to Sudhir Mishra in Is Raat Ki Subah Nahin (1996). Subsequently, she was Associate director, Second Unit Director and Screenplay writer and edited the film Hazaaron Khwaishein Aisi for which she won the Best Story Filmfare Award, Zee Cine Award and Star Screen Award. It was a love story set against the political backdrop of India in the 1970s.

She was the writer-director of the contemporary urban thriller Kal: Yesterday and Tomorrow (2005), which also won her the Osian's Cinefan Film Festival Critics Award. She raised the financing for this film by making a business plan and bringing together a consortium of 14 investors'.

Subsequently, she started the production company R.A.T Films with two partners Ashutosh Shah and Taher Shabbir which has done over a hundred commercials for a variety of products as well as produced the animation film Hanuman: Da' Damdaar (2017) which she wrote and directed. It was the biggest animation film release in India ever, voiced by the superstar Salman Khan and featuring a litany of Bollywood stars; Raveena Tandon, Javed Akhtar, Kunal Khemu, Vinay Pathak, Chunky Pandey, Saurabh Shukla and Makrand Deshpande.

Her film Guilty(2020) on Netflix starring Kiara Advani has met with a lot of success and acclaim. It is set in an elite Delhi College and centers around an allegation of rape during the #MeToo Movement in India.

She has also was the showrunner and the lead director for the 2020 8-part comedy series 'Hundred' on the platform Disney+ Hotstar which she and her partners created, wrote and produced. The show is a light and irreverent take on two very different women who struggle to do what they want to do in the city of Mumbai. One of them is played by Lara Dutta as a police woman who feels she can't break the glass ceiling. The other is a young girl, played by Rinku Rajguru who discovers she has only a hundred days to live. Together, they try and make their lives count.

Personal life 
Narain is the single mother of her daughter Vira who she adopted in 2019.

Filmography

As Assistant Director 
 Khoya Khoya Chand (2007) - also editor 
 Hazaaron Khwaishein Aisi (2003) (associate director)
 Is Raat Ki Subah Nahin (1996)

Awards
 Filmfare Award
 Best Story: Hazaaron Khwaishein Aisi  
 Osian's Cinefan Film Festival of Asian and Arab Cinema Critics' Award
 In the Pink Finalist at Wildscreen Awards 2008
 The Last Dance Finalist at Wildscreen Awards 2008

References

External links
 

Film directors from Mumbai
Hindi-language film directors
Indian women screenwriters
1976 births
Living people
Hindi screenwriters
Women writers from Maharashtra
21st-century Indian women writers
21st-century Indian dramatists and playwrights
Screenwriters from Mumbai
21st-century Indian screenwriters